Richard "Rich" Costanzo (born February 17, 1986 in Pittsburgh, Pennsylvania) is an American soccer player who formerly played for the Pittsburgh Riverhounds in the USL Professional Division.  Costanzo is currently the head coach of George Mason.

Career

Youth and high school
Costanzo attended Thomas Jefferson High School in Pittsburgh, where he was a two-time NSCAA/adidas All-American, a two-time regional All-American, and was twice named the WPIAL (Western Pennsylvania Interscholastic Athletic League) Player of the Year.  In 2003, he was also named the NSCAA Pennsylvania State Player of the Year  and chosen as an EA Sports All-American.  He helped lead the Jaguars to the PIAA (Pennsylvania Interscholastic Athletic Association) State Championship three times, winning the state title in 2002.

Costanzo was selected to play for the Region I Olympic Development Program team from 2000–2005 and was a member of the U.S. U–18 National team player pool.

He started his youth soccer in Pittsburgh for the Beadling Soccer Club, before joining FC Delco on the other side of the state.

College
Costanzo started college soccer at Pennsylvania State University where he was named the 2004 Big Ten Freshman of the Year.  He was also named Freshman All-America by Soccer America, Top Draw Soccer, and College Soccer News. He transferred to the University of Maryland, College Park to continue his collegiate career. He became a team captain for the Terps in the 2008 season, and helped lead the team to an ACC Championship and  NCAA Division I National Championship.

Professional
Having not been drafted by Major League Soccer Costanzo signed with Minnesota Thunder on February 26, 2009. He made his professional debut on April 11, 2009, as a second-half substitute in Minnesota's 2009 season-opening game against the Carolina RailHawks.

Costanzo was on the 2010–11 roster of the Baltimore Blast indoor soccer team, but appeared in no games.

Honors

Rochester Rhinos
 USSF Division 2 Pro League Regular Season Champions: 2010
 USL Pro  2011 Regular Season Champions

University of Maryland
 NCAA Men's Division I Soccer Championship: 2008

References

External links
 Rich Costanzo Bio
 Maryland Terrapins bio

1986 births
Living people
American soccer players
Association football defenders
Baltimore Blast (2008–2014 MISL) players
Maryland Terrapins men's soccer players
Minnesota Thunder players
Penn State Nittany Lions men's soccer players
Pittsburgh Riverhounds SC players
Rochester New York FC players
Soccer players from Pittsburgh
USL First Division players
USSF Division 2 Professional League players
USL Championship players
George Mason Patriots men's soccer coaches